The Monty Python comedy troupe branched off into a variety of different media after the success of their sketch comedy television series, Monty Python's Flying Circus.

Television
Monty Python's Flying Circus (1969–1974)
Monty Python's Fliegender Zirkus (1972)
Parrot Sketch Not Included – 20 Years of Monty Python (1989)
Monty Python Live at Aspen (1998)
Python Night – 30 Years of Monty Python (1999)
Monty Python's Personal Best (2006)

Films
 And Now for Something Completely Different (1971)
 Monty Python and the Holy Grail (1975)
 Monty Python's Life of Brian (1979)
 Monty Python Live at the Hollywood Bowl (1982)
 Monty Python's The Meaning of Life (1983)
 Monty Python Live (Mostly) (2014)

Books
The following official Monty Python books authored by the team members have been published, mostly in large format:

 Monty Python's Big Red Book (1971) – Hardcover and paperback. Covers vary.
 The Brand New Monty Python Bok (1973) (Paperback edition issued as The Brand New Monty Python Papperbok)
 Monty Python and the Holy Grail (Book) (1977) (First draft and shooting scripts, with Gilliam pictures, lobby cards, stills, correspondence and cost breakdown - the film script later republished separately as a standard paperback)
 Monty Python's The Life of Brian/MONTYPYTHONSCRAPBOOK (1979) (Expanded film script plus a lot of extra material published back-to-back with it - the film script later published separately as a standard paperback)
 The Complete Works of Shakespeare and Monty Python: Vol. 1 – Monty Python (1981) (a repackaging of both the Big Red Book and the Brand New Bok)
 Monty Python's The Meaning of Life (1983) (Expanded film script with photos)
 The Monty Python Gift Boks (1986) (Reissues of paperback editions of Big Red Book and the Brand New Papperbok wrapped in a mini poster)
 Monty Python's Flying Circus: Just the Words (1989) (Mostly complete transcripts of all 4 television series. Originally published in two volumes)
 The Fairly Incomplete & Rather Badly Illustrated Monty Python Song Book (1994)
 Monty Python's Fliegender Zirkus - Sämtliche Deutschen Shows (1998) (Germany-only scriptbook for the two Fliegender Zirkus specials)
 A Pocketful of Python - Picked by Terry Jones (1999) (Terry Jones's favourite Python moments.)
 A Pocketful of Python - Picked by John Cleese (1999) (John Cleese's favourite Python moments.)
 A Pocketful of Python - Picked by Terry Gilliam (2000) (Terry Gilliam's favourite Python moments.)
 A Pocketful of Python - Picked by Michael Palin (2000) (Michael Palin's favourite Python moments.)
 A Pocketful of Python - Picked by Eric Idle (2002) (Eric Idle's favourite Python moments.)
 The Pythons Autobiography by The Pythons (2003) (Edited by Bob McCabe - a large-format, illustrated coffee table book, oral history of Monty Python told through collection of interviews from Python members and friends; later reissued as small, text-only paperback.)
 The Very Best of Monty Python (2006) (Full-colour paperback combining the five volumes of A Pocketful of Python)
 Monty Python Live! (2009) (A combination of oral history and new Python comedy book including the complete illustrated libretto of Python's live shows)

Records

Albums

Studio albums

Live albums

Soundtrack albums

Compilation albums

Box sets

Singles

Documentaries
 Film Night - On Location with Monty Python and the Holy Grail (BBC 2, 1974)
 The Pythons (BBC 1, 1979)
 The Meaning of Monty Python's Meaning of Life (ITV, 1983)
 Life of Python (US version) (Showtime, 1990)
 Life of Python (UK version) (BBC 1, 1990)
 30 Years of Monty Python - A Revelation (Paramount Comedy Channel, 1999)
 It's...The Monty Python Story (BBC 2, 1999)
 Pythonland (BBC 2, 1999)
 From Spam To Sperm - Monty Python's Greatest Hits (BBC 2, 1999)
 The Quest for the Holy Grail Locations (DVD, 2001)
 The Meaning of Making The Meaning of Life (DVD, 2003)
 Comedy Connections - Monty Python's Flying Circus (BBC 1, 2005)
 The Secret Life of Brian (Channel 4, 2007)
 What The Pythons Did Next... (Channel 4, 2007)
 The Story of Brian (Alternate extended edit of The Secret Life of Brian) (DVD/Blu-ray, 2007) 
 Before the Flying Circus (DVD, 2008)
 Monty Python Conquers America (DVD, 2008)
 Movie Connections - Monty Python and the Holy Grail (BBC 1, 2009)
 Monty Python: Almost the Truth (Lawyers Cut) (DVD/Blu-ray, 2009)
 The Meaning of Monty Python (Blu-ray, 2013)
 Monty Python: And Now for Something Rather Similar (BBC 1, 2014)
 Monty Python: The Meaning of Live (UKTV Gold, 2014)
 Python at 50: Silly Talks and Holy Grails (BBC 2, 2019)

Stage productions
 Spamalot (2004)
 Not the Messiah (He's a Very Naughty Boy) (2007)
 An Evening Without Monty Python (2009)
 Monty Python Live (Mostly) (2014)

Computer and video games

 Monty Python's Flying Circus: The Computer Game (1991)
 Monty Python's Complete Waste of Time (1994)
 Live With(out) Monty Python (1994)
 Monty Python's More Naughty Bits (1994)
 Monty Python's Invasion from the Planet Skyron (1995)
 Monty Python & the Quest for the Holy Grail (1996)
 Monty Python's The Meaning of Life (1997)

Other collaborations outside Monty Python
In addition to their work as a group, the six members have collaborated with each other on numerous other film and television projects outside Monty Python.

Notes

References

Further reading
 From Fringe to Flying Circus – Roger Wilmut (1980)
 Monty Python: The Case Against Irreverence, Scurrility, Profanity, Vilification, and Licentious Abuse – Robert Hewison (1981)
 Monty Python: Complete and Utter Theory of the Grotesque – John O. Thompson (1982)
 Life of Python – George Perry (1983)
 The First 20 Years of Monty Python – Kim "Howard" Johnson (1989)
 And Now for Something Completely Trivial: The Monty Python Trivia and Quiz Book – Kim "Howard" Johnson (1991)
 Monty Python: A Chronological Listing of the Troupe's Creative Output and Articles and Reviews About Them, 1969–89 – Douglas L. McCall (1992)
 Life Before and After Monty Python: The Solo Flights of the Flying Circus – Kim "Howard" Johnson (1993)
 Monty Python's Complete Waste of Time : An Official Compendium of Answers to Ruddy Questions Not Normally Considered Relevant to Mounties! – Rusel Demaria (1995)
 The First 28 Years of Monty Python – Kim "Howard" Johnson (1998)
 Monty Python Speaks! – David Morgan (1999)
 The (Non-Inflatable) Monty Python TV Companion – Jim Yoakum (1999)
 The Pythons' Autobiography by The Pythons (2003)
 Monty Python and Philosophy: Nudge, Nudge, Think, Think! – Gary L. Hardcastle and George A. Reisch (2006)
 And Now For Something Completely Digital: The Complete Illustrated Guide to Monty Python – Alan Parker & Mick O'Shea (2006)
 Monty Python's Tunisian Holiday – Kim "Howard" Johnson (2008)

.Projects